The 2016 Robert Morris Colonials football team represented Robert Morris University during the 2016 NCAA Division I FCS football season. They were led by third-year head coach John Banaszak and played their home games at Joe Walton Stadium. They were a member of the Northeast Conference. They finished with a record of 2–9, 1–5 in NEC play, to finish in a three-way tie for fifth place.

Schedule

Game summaries

Alderson Broaddus

at Dayton

at Youngstown State

Malone

at Liberty

Saint Francis (PA)

at Duquesne

at Sacred Heart

Central Connecticut

at Bryant

Wagner

References

Robert Morris
Robert Morris Colonials football seasons
Robert Morris Colonials football